Names derived from Santoro (from ) include the following:
Santori
Santorio
Santorelli
Santorielli
Santorini
Santorinite (an igneous rock)
Santorum

References

Santoro